Lopezaria is a genus of lichenized fungi in the family Ramalinaceae.

The genus name of Lopezaria is in honour of Manuel López-Figueiras (1915-2012), who was a (Spanish-) Venezuelan botanist (Mycology and Lichenology), from the University of Havana (in Cuba).

The genus was circumscribed by Klaus Kalb and Josef Hafellner in Lich. Neotropici fasc. XI, vol.2 in 1990.

References

Ramalinaceae
Lichen genera
Lecanorales genera
Taxa named by Klaus Kalb
Taxa named by Josef Hafellner
Taxa described in 1990